Margaret Chung Lai Kei (sometimes romanized as Chung Lai-kai, born 3 November 1976 in Toronto) is a Hong Kong-based model, actor and yoga instructor.

Personal life
She was born and raised in Toronto, Ontario as the youngest of three siblings, and moved to Hong Kong at age 18 after signing a five-year contract with TVB. At age 21, she began to support her family with her earnings after her father retired.

Chung was romantically linked to Joey Leung, but the pair split in 2006. Chung married businessman Nardone Ruggero in July 2010, and they have two daughters. Her older daughter, Isabella, has Wolf–Hirschhorn syndrome.

Filmography

Television (TVB)

Film

References

External links
 
 
 

1976 births
Living people
Actresses from Toronto
Hong Kong television actresses
20th-century Hong Kong actresses
21st-century Hong Kong actresses
Canadian-born Hong Kong artists